The Taint is an American silent film produced by Sid Films and distributed by Lubin Manufacturing Company. It was directed by Sidney Olcott with Valentine Grant, James Vincent and Pat O'Malley in the leading roles.

Cast
 Valentine Grant - Mabel Stuart
 James Vincent - Arthur Easton
 Pat O'Malley - Bert Stuart
 Roy Sheldon - Frank Board

References
 Motography, December 4, 1915. 
 The New York Dramatic Mirror, December 4, 1915, p 29.

External links

 The Taint website dedicated to Sidney Olcott

1915 films
Silent American drama films
American silent short films
Films directed by Sidney Olcott
1915 short films
1915 drama films
American black-and-white films
1910s American films